The 2020 Atlantic Coast Conference women's soccer tournament was the 33rd edition of the ACC Women's Soccer Tournament, which decided the Atlantic Coast Conference champion. All rounds were played at Sahlen's Stadium in Cary, NC.

No. 1 seed Florida State took home their seventh ACC tournament championship, defeating No. 2 seed North Carolina.

Background  

The format of the tournament was announced in conjunction with all other ACC fall sports on July 29, 2020.

Due to the ongoing COVID-19 pandemic, the format of the 2020 tournament changed multiple times. Originally, the 2020 ACC Tournament was to only feature 4 teams with all matches played at Sahlen's Stadium to create an "isolation zone" (similar to the 2020 NBA Bubble) to minimize the spread of the pandemic. The semifinals were to be played on November 6, 2020, with the final was to be played on November 8, 2020.

On September 4, 2020, the format again changed, expanding the tournament from four to eight teams. The quarterfinals to be played on November 10, the semifinals on November 13, and the championship game on November 15.

Qualification 

The top eight teams in the Atlantic Coast Conference earned a berth into the ACC Tournament. All three tournament rounds took place at Sahlen's Stadium in Cary, North Carolina.  North Carolina and Florida State finished tied for first with 8–0–0 regular season records.  Florida State won the tiebreaker over North Carolina by goal differential in conference games, +21 to +16.  Louisville, Virginia Tech, and Notre Dame finished in a three way tie for sixth place, all with a 4–4–0 regular season record.  The goal differential tiebreaker was applied and Notre Dame was awarded the eighth seed.  Louisville and Virginia Tech were still tied after the goal differential tiebreaker.  Louisville won the second tiebreaker of head-to-head record, having won their match 1–0 during the regular season.

Bracket

Schedule

Quarterfinals

Semifinals

Final

Statistics

Goalscorers

All Tournament Team

MVP in boldSource:

See also 
 Atlantic Coast Conference
 2020 Atlantic Coast Conference women's soccer season
 2020 NCAA Division I women's soccer season

References 

ACC Women's Soccer Tournament
2020 Atlantic Coast Conference women's soccer season